Albert Bethel (Banbridge, 1 April 1874 – 29 July 1935, Fleetwood) was a cotton goods manufacturer and Conservative Party politician in the United Kingdom.

He was elected as Member of Parliament (MP) for Eccles at the 1924 general election, but was defeated at the 1929 general election by the Labour Party candidate, David Mort. He did not stand for Parliament again.

References

External links 
 

1874 births
1935 deaths
Conservative Party (UK) MPs for English constituencies
UK MPs 1924–1929